The 2018–19 season is the club's 99th season in existence. East Bengal discontinued its tie-up with their main sponsors "Kingfisher" after 20 long years of partnership. On 5th July 2018, East Bengal announced a partnership with business giants Quess Corp as their main sponsors, leading to the formation of a new entity named "Quess East Bengal FC Pvt. Ltd." (QEBFC).

Pre-Season Overview
East Bengal FC roped in 4 players from 2017–18 I-League champions Minerva Punjab F.C.: goal-keeper Rakshit Dagar, defender Kamalpreet Singh, midfielder Kassim Aidara and forward Bali Gagandeep. East Bengal FC also signed experienced defender Kingshuk Debnath from arch-rivals Mohun Bagan. Veteran custodian Abhra Mondal rejoined East Bengal FC from Bengaluru FC. East Bengal FC also announced the signing of midfielder Sanchayan Samaddar who was part of the Bengal Santosh Trophy squad and promoted youngstar  Ginkaholen Haokip from their junior squad. East Bengal FC roped in Costa Rica national team centre-back Jhonny Acosta who played all 3 games in the 2018 FIFA World Cup for a rumored fee of Rs. 1.4 Cr.
On 18 August, East Bengal FC announced former Real madrid B manager Alejandro Menéndez García as the new coach.
On 24 August, East Bengal FC announced the signing of former Granada C.F. centreback Borja Gómez Pérez.
On 30 August, East Bengal FC signed former Mexico international Enrique Esqueda on a free transfer, however making him the highest paid footballer in I-League with a rumoured of Rs 4.2 Cr.

Transfers

Promoted from Academy

Transfers IN

Released Mid-Season

Loaned Out

Team

First-team Squad

{|class="wikitable" style="text-align:center; font-size:90%; width:80%;"
|-
!style="background:#ff0000; color:#ffff00; text-align:center;"|No.
!style="background:#ff0000; color:#ffff00; text-align:center;"|Name
!style="background:#ff0000; color:#ffff00; text-align:center;"|Nationality
!style="background:#ff0000; color:#ffff00; text-align:center;"|Position
!style="background:#ff0000; color:#ffff00; text-align:center;"|Date of Birth (Age)
|-
!colspan=5 style="background:#ffff00; color:#ff0000; text-align:center;"|Goalkeepers
|-
|1
|Ubaid CK
|
|GK
|
|-
|12
|Abhra Mondal
|
|GK
|
|-
|32
|Mirshad Michu
|
|GK
|
|-
|40
|Rakshit Dagar
|
|GK
|
|-
!colspan=5 style="background:#ff0000; color:#ffff00; text-align:center;"|Defenders
|-
|2
|Jhonny Acosta
|
|CB
|
|-
|3
|Borja Gómez Pérez
|
|CB
|
|-
|4
|Kingshuk Debnath
|
|CB
|
|-
|5
|Kamalpreet Singh
|
|RB
|
|-
|23
|Lalrozama Fanai
|
|LB
|
|-
|24
|Salam Ranjan Singh
|
|RB/LB/CB
|
|-
|25
|Samad Ali Mallick
|
|RB
|
|-
|27
|Lalramchullova
|
|RB/LB
|
|-
|28
|Koushik Sarkar
|
|CB
|
|-
|29
|Mehtab Singh
|
|RB
|
|-
|33
|Rahul Ghosh
|
|LB
|
|-
|39
|Gurmukh Singh
|
|RB
|
|-
|41
|Manoj Mohammed
|
|LB
|
|-
!colspan=5 style="background:#ffff00; color:#ff0000; text-align:center;"|Midfielders
|-
|7
|Surabuddin Mollick
|
|RW
|
|-
|8
|Jaime Santos Colado
|
|RW/LW
|
|-
|10
|Antonio Rodríguez Dovale
|
|CAM
|
|-
|15
|Siam Hanghal
|
|CM
|
|-
|16
|Kassim Aidara
|
|CDM
|
|-
|17
|Laldanmawia Ralte
|
|RW
|
|-
|20
|Lalrindika Ralte
|
|RW
|
|-
|30
|Brandon Vanlalremdika
|
|LW
|
|-
|34
|Sanchayan Samaddar
|
|CM
|
|-
|35
|Yami Longvah
|
|LW
|
|-
|36
|Ginkaholen Haokip
|
|CAM
|
|-
|38
|Prakash Sarkar
|
|CDM/RB
|
|-
|43
|PC Rohlupuia
|
|CAM
|
|-
!colspan=5 style="background:#ff0000; color:#ffff00; text-align:center;"|Forwards
|-
|9
|Enrique Esqueda
|
|FW
|
|-
|11
|Bali Gagandeep
|
|FW
|
|-
|22
|Jobi Justin
|
|FW
|
|-
|26
|K. Bidyashagar Singh
|
|FW
|
|-
|37
|Tetepuia Lalchanhima
|
|FW
|
|-
|42
|Telem Suranjit Singh
|
|FW
|
|-

Technical staff

Season Overview
East Bengal FC started the season with an entire makeover. East Bengal FC parted ways with long time sponsors Kingfisher after 20 years and entered into a new partnership with Quess Corp as their main investors. East Bengal FC is will be taking part in the 2018–19 I- League. East Bengal FC roped in Costa Rica national team center back Jhonny Acosta who played all 3 games in the 2018 FIFA World Cup. East Bengal also roped in ex-Granada CF centre-back Borja Gómez Pérez to strengthen their defence for their quest for the 2018–19 I-League. East Bengal announced ex-Real madrid B manager Alejandro Menéndez as the new coach.

August
East Bengal FC started off as the 8 times defending champions of the Calcutta Football League, in search of the 9th consecutive league title. The red and gold brigade started off with an abandoned game against Tollygunge Agragami however, won 2-0 comfortably against WB Police FC with Lalrindika Ralte opening the scoring for the season and Kassim Aidara making it 2–0.
East Bengal FC succumbed to the defensive of Calcutta Customs FC as they failed to score and the match ended a goalless draw. 
East Bengal FC won the next 5 games to lead to the all-important Kolkata Derby.

September
East Bengal FC made a great comeback against their arch-rivals Mohun Bagan in the first Kolkata Derby of the season, after the Mariners led 2-0 within 30 minutes. East Bengal FC rallied from behind with goals from star debutante Jhonny Acosta and the equalised from Laldanmawia Ralte from a Lalrindika Ralte corner.
East Bengal FC however lost the 2 next matches against Peerless FC and Mohammedan SC and eventually lost the title to arch-rivals Mohun Bagan after holding it for 8 long years. 

East Bengal FC suffered a huge blow when the AIFF put on a Transfer Ban on the Red and Golds which will prevent them from signing any further player until 31 January 2018. The Transfer Ban was imposed after the AIFF disciplinary committee found East Bengal FC guilty of unethically poaching Sukhwinder Singh of Minerva Punjab which the player was still in contract with the team from Punjab.
Alejandro Menéndez took over the reins of the East Bengal FC manager after the Calcutta Football League ended and planned to play a few friendlies as a pre-season before the 2018–19 I-League.
East Bengal FC played FC Goa in a pre-season friendly on 22 September at Bambolim, Stadium, Goa and lost via a single goal after a terrific solo effort from Ferran Corominas put the Goan side ahead in the 75th minute. East Bengal put up a great fight against the Indian Super League side after just 3 days of new coach Alejandro Menendez took over.

October
East Bengal FC flew off to Malaysia for 3 weeks to conduct the Pre-season for the upcoming 2018–19 I-League. East Bengal FC would stay at the MSN Sports Complex Residential Training Facilities at Kuala Lumpur and play 5 practice matches in the interim. 
East Bengal FC faced Malaysia Premier League side UiTM F.C. on 7 October in the first Pre-season game in Malaysia. After conceding an early goal, the Red and Gold brigade made a come-back and rallied past 4 goals to win 1–4 against the Malaysian side. Yami Longvah, Enrique Esqueda, Mahmoud Amnah and Jobi Justin were on the score-sheet. East Bengal was to play against another Malaysia Premier League side UKM F.C. on 10 October in the second of the 5 pre-season friendlies however due to bad pitch conditions due to excessive rainfall, the match was abandoned before kick-off.East Bengal played against Malaysia Super League side Terengganu F.C. on 13 October in the next Pre-season friendly game in Malaysia. Ex-East Bengal fans' heartthrob Do Dong Hyun featured in the match against the Red and Golds. East Bengal FC drew 0–0 against the Malaysia Super League side who became runners-up in the 2018 Malaysia Cup.East Bengal played against Malaysia Premier League side PDRM FA in the next pre-season game where they won handsomely by a 6-2 margin, with Jobi Justin netting twice and goals each from Enrique Esqueda, Surabuddin Mollick and Bidyashagar Singh with another one being an own-goal. 
East Bengal faced UiTM F.C. Reserves in the last pre-season friendly at Malaysia where they won 1-0 courtesy of a goal from Enrique Esqueda. The Red and Gold brigade remain undefeated in the pre-season tour in Malaysia

East Bengal FC faced NEROCA F.C. in the first game of 2018–19 I-League season, away at Imphal. Mexican frontman Enrique Esqueda's brace with one in each half ensured the Red and Golds have a perfect start to the campaign. Academy graduate Manoj Mohammed debuted for the Red and Golds as a Left-back and gained huge praise for his excellent performance.

November
East Bengal FC faced Shillong Lajong F.C. in the second game of the campaign, again away at Shillong which they won 3–1. Jobi Justin's brace in the first half along with academy graduate Bidyashagar Singh's goal in the second half ensured East Bengal FC win. Manoj Mohammed again started for the Red and Gold brigade as East Bengal FC defence looked properly organized to throw off any attack from the home side. With 6 points from the first two games, this is East Bengal FC's best start to an I-League campaign since 2010–11. 
East Bengal FC faced Chennai City F.C. on 13 November, at Salt Lake Stadium, Kolkata for the first home game of the season which they lost 1–2. Sandro Rodríguez scored the first goal from a free-kick in the dying moments of the first half for Chennai City F.C. to give them a 1–0 lead at HT. Enrique Esqueda equalized for the Red and Golds however Néstor Gordillo scored the winner for the away team in the 85th min from the spot. 
On 21 November, AIFF lifted the ban imposed on East Bengal FC on signing new players. On 23 November, East Bengal FC announced the signing of their 6th Foreigner ]Jaime Santos Colado of Spain who previously played in the Segunda Division B for teams like Sporting de Gijón B and CD Mirandés as a Winger and Attacking midfielder.
East Bengal FC faced Aizawl F.C. next on 24 November, away at Aizawl and in a crunch game, the Red and Gold brigade lost 3–2. Aizawl F.C. took the lead early, but East Bengal FC came back into the game in the second half to lead 1-2 however two late goals from the home side took the game away from East Bengal FC. East Bengal FC was denied a clear goal, when Lalramchullova's free-kick hit the crossbar and bounced back from inside the goal into play, the referee kept the game on, not adjudging it a goal.

December
East Bengal FC faced the reigning champions Minerva Punjab F.C. on 4 December, at the Salt Lake Stadium, Kolkata where they lost by a solitary goal. William Opoku scored the decisive goal in the 78th minute of the game after East Bengal custodian Ubaid C.K. made a mistake. This was East Bengal FC's 3rd defeat in succession. 
East Bengal FC faced the Gokulam Kerala F.C. on 8 December, at the Salt Lake Stadium, Kolkata next which they won by 3–1, credit to an all-round performance from Joby Justin who assisted the first goal for Brandon Vanlalremdika, scored the second and was a constant threat at the Gokulam Kerala's penalty box. Lalramchullova scored the third for the Red and Gold Brigade which ensured 3 points for the home side.
East Bengal FC faced Mohun Bagan on 16 December, at the Salt Lake Stadium, Kolkata for the first leg of Kolkata Derby of the I-League season and in a thrilling encounter, the Red and Gold brigade emerged victorious by 3–2 with the Mariners going down to 10 men in the second half. It was Mohun Bagan who took an early lead in the 13 min when Omar Elhussieny dodged past Lalramchullova to put in a perfect cross for Azharuddin Mallick to slot in into an empty net. East Bengal FC equalized just 4 minutes later with Laldanmawia Ralte netting home from an excellent through ball from Jobi Justin. Jobi Justin was again on the mark when he scored in the 44th minute with a sublime overhead volley to take the lead in the Kolkata Derby. After the break, Mohun Bagan was down to 10 men as Kingsley Obumneme was sent off for a double booking when he stopped Jobi Justin from behind after he was nutmegged. East Bengal FC increased their lead from the resulting free-kick as Laldanmawia Ralte was again at the position from a perfect cross from Lalrindika Ralte to make it 3–1 in the 61st minute. This was Laldanmawia Ralte's 4th goal in Kolkata Derby. Dipanda Dicka reduced the margin for Mohun Bagan in the 75th minute, however, the Red and Gold brigade held on to the lead and won their first Derby after 33 months gap.
East Bengal FC faced Churchill Brothers on 20 December, at the Tilak Maidan in Goa and after being 1-0 down within 2 minutes from a Willis Plaza strike, East Bengal rallied back with strikes from Jaime Santos and Lalrindika Ralte. Jaime Santos scored a perfect volley from a Lalrindika Ralte corner to equalize the game and in the second half it was Lalrindika Ralte himself who scored directly from a free-kick to win 3 points for the Red and Gold brigade.
East Bengal FC faced Real Kashmir F.C. on 28 December, at home but failed to get 3 points from the fixture after the game ended in a 1–1 draw. Lalramchullova put the ball inside his own net just after the break but it was none other than Jobi Justin who scored the equalizer for East Bengal FC to secure a point for the home side.

January
East Bengal FC faced Indian Arrows on 8 January 2019 at Kalinga Stadium in Bhubaneshwar and in a hard-fought contest the Red and Gold brigade came out victorious by 1–2, courtesy of goals from Laldanmawia Ralte and Jobi Justin one in each half. Arrows scored one consolation late in the second half but East Bengal FC managed to hold on to the lead and emerge with 3 points/ Lalrindika Ralte missed a penalty in the first half which could have increased the lead for East Bengal FC.
East Bengal FC faced Chennai City F.C. away at Coimbatore on 14 January next where in a crunch encounter East Bengal FC lost 2-1 even after taking the lead in the 9th minute courtesy of a Laldanmawia Ralte goal. The home team rallied to score 2 goals with defensive lapses from the Red and Gold Brigade.
East Bengal FC faced Indian Arrows next on 18 January at home and in a lacklusture game, the Red and Gold brigade managed to win by a solitary goal courtesy of Jaime Santos who tapped home from a Jobby Justin grounded cross.
East Bengal FC faced Mohun Bagan next on 27 January in the return leg of the Kolkata Derby and like the first leg derby, East Bengal FC again managed to win against their arch-rivals by 2–0 with goals from Jaime Santos and Jobby Justin. This was the first time since 2003–04, and only the 3rd time overall that East Bengal FC managed an NFL/I-League Derby Double against their arch-rivals Mohun Bagan.

February
East Bengal FC faced NEROCA F.C. next on 7 February at the Salt Lake Stadium and made a remarkable comeback victory after going behind 0-1 as early as in the 3rd minute when Chencho Gyeltshen scored for the visitors. The home team tried hard but could find the back of the net, until Enrique Esqueda came in as a super sub and scored a brilliant headed brace to secure all three points for East Bengal FC
East Bengal FC faced Shillong Lajong F.C. next on 14 February at the Salt Lake Stadium and displayed complete dominance as they won by 5–0 against the highlanders. Laldanmawia Ralte bragged the first hat-trick of the season for East Bengal FC while the other two were scored by Jobby Justin and Enrique Esqueda.
East Bengal FC faced Churchill Brothers S.C. next on 17 February at the Salt Lake Stadium and could only manage a 1–1 draw after ex-East Bengal FC frontman Willis Plaza scored to take a 0–1 lead for the away team, which was equalized by Kassim Aidara, who headed home from a Lalrindika Ralte freekick to make it 1–1.
East Bengal FC faced Aizawl F.C. next on 25 February at the Salt Lake Stadium for the last home game of the season and could only manage a point which hampered their title hopes. Aizawl F.C. took the lead in the first half which was then equalized by Enrique Esqueda in the second half. The Red and Gold brigade failed to score the winning goal as Jobby Justin's header came off the bar in the dying minutes of the match.
Jobby Justin was suspended after the match for spitting charges and is supposed to miss the next 6 matches.
East Bengal FC faced Real Kashmir F.C. next on 28 February at Delhi and in a sublime first half display took an early lead of 2–0 with goals from Enrique Esqueda and Jaime Santos. The Kashmir team managed to score a goal in the second half from the penalty spot however East Bengal FC managed to emerge victorious, keeping their title hopes alive.

March
East Bengal FC faced Minerva Punjab F.C. in the penultimate game of the season on 3 March at Chandigarh and had to win to keep their tile hopes alive and ina thriller of a game, East Bengal FC managed a 1–0 win courtesy of a cool finish from none other than frontman Enrique Esqueda. With this victory, East Bengal FC sits at 39 points from 19 matches, just 1 point behind the league leaders Chennai City F.C. with the last match scheduled on 9 March 2019 for both the teams, which will be the decider for the 2018–19 I-League title.
On 6th Match, East Bengal FC announced a 2 years contract extension for coach Alejandro Menéndez Garcia and his team.

April
East Bengal F.C. gave walk over to Delhi Dynamos F.C. in the Round of 16 in 2019 Indian Super Cup.

Kit
Supplier: TYKA / Sponsors: Quess Corp / Co-Sponsor:

Competitions

Overall
{| class="wikitable" style="text-align:center; width:850px;"
|-
! style="text-align:center; width:150px;" | Competition
! style="text-align:center; width:170px;" | First match
! style="text-align:center; width:170px;" |  Last match
! style="text-align:center; width:170px;" | Final Position
|-
|style="text-align:left;"|IFA Shield 
| 8 July 2018
| 19 July 2018
Champions 
|-
|style="text-align:left;"|Calcutta Football League
| 3 August 2018
| 18 September 2018
| 3rd
|-
|style="text-align:left;"|GTA Chairman's Gold Cup (Darjeeling)
|15 December 2018
|23 December 2018
Champions 
|-
|style="text-align:left;"|I-League
| 27 October 2018
| 9 March 2019
 Runners up
|-
|style="text-align:left;"|Super Cup
| 30 March 2019
| 30 March 2019
| Round of 16 
|-
|}

Overview

Calcutta Football League

Matches

Pre season

Fixtures & results

I-League

Result summary

Results by round

Matches

Super Cup

East Bengal FC along with six other I-League clubs — Minerva Punjab F.C., Mohun Bagan, NEROCA F.C., Gokulam Kerala F.C., Aizawl F.C., and Chennai City F.C. — announced they will withdraw from Super Cup, citing "unfair treatment to I-League clubs."

Brackets

Matches

Statistics

Appearances

 Players with no appearances are not included in the list.

Goal Scorers

Hat-tricks

Clean Sheets

Correct as of matches played on 9 March 2019

Disciplinary record

Honours

Titles Won
 2018 IFA Shield Champions (29th time)
*U-19 tournament since 2015. Defeated Mohun Bagan U-19 in the final: 1–1; 4–3  

 GTA Chairman's Gold Cup (Darjeeling Gold Cup 2018) Champions (5th time)
East Bengal Reserves team played in the tournament. Defeated Mohammedan Sporting in the final: 0-0; 3-1

Player Awards

Quess EBFC Player of the Month

See also
 2018–19 in Indian football
 2018–19 Calcutta Premier Division
 2018–19 I-League
 2019 Super Cup
 List of East Bengal F.C. managers
 List of Foreign Players for East Bengal FC

References

East Bengal Club seasons
East Bengal F.C.